Millpu (Quechua for "throat, gullet", also spelled Millpo)  is a mountain in the Andes of Peru which reaches a height of approximately . It is located in the Huánuco Region, Huamalíes Province, Singa District.

References 

Mountains of Peru
Mountains of Huánuco Region